Dolichoderinae is a subfamily of ants, which includes species such as the Argentine ant (Linepithema humile), the erratic ant, the odorous house ant, and the cone ant. The subfamily presents a great diversity of species throughout the world, distributed in different biogeographic realms, from the Palearctic, Nearctic, Afrotropical region and Malaysia, to the Middle East, Australian, and Neotropical regions.

This subfamily is distinguished by having a single petiole (no post-petiole) and a slit-like orifice, from which chemical compounds are released.  Dolichoderine ants do not possess a sting, unlike ants in some other subfamilies, such as Ponerinae and Myrmicinae, instead relying on the chemical defensive compounds produced from the anal gland.

Of the compounds produced by dolichoderine ants, several terpenoids were identified including the previously unknown iridomyrmecin, isoiridomyrmecin, and iridodial. Such compounds are responsible for the smell given off by ants of this subfamily when crushed or disturbed.

Tribes and genera

Bothriomyrmecini Dubovikov, 2005
Arnoldius Dubovikov, 2005
Bothriomyrmex Emery, 1869
Chronoxenus Santschi, 1919
Loweriella Shattuck, 1992
Ravavy Fisher, 2009
Dolichoderini Forel, 1878
Dolichoderus Lund, 1831
Leptomyrmecini Emery, 1913
Anillidris Santschi, 1936
Anonychomyrma Donisthorpe, 1947
Azteca Forel, 1878
†Chronomyrmex McKellar, Glasier & Engel, 2013
Doleromyrma Forel, 1907
Dorymyrmex Mayr, 1866
Forelius Emery, 1888
Froggattella Forel, 1902
Gracilidris Wild & Cuezzo, 2006
Iridomyrmex Mayr, 1862
Leptomyrmex Mayr, 1862
Linepithema Mayr, 1866
Nebothriomyrmex Dubovikov, 2004
Ochetellus Shattuck, 1992
Papyrius Shattuck, 1992
Philidris Shattuck, 1992
Turneria Forel, 1895
†Miomyrmecini Carpenter, 1930
†Miomyrmex Carpenter, 1930
Tapinomini Emery, 1913
Aptinoma Fisher, 2009
Axinidris Weber, 1941
†Ctenobethylus Brues, 1939
Ecphorella Forel, 1909
Liometopum Mayr, 1861
Tapinoma Förster, 1850
Technomyrmex Mayr, 1872
incertae sedis
†Alloiomma Zhang, 1989
†Asymphylomyrmex Wheeler, 1915
†Elaeomyrmex Carpenter, 1930
†Elaphrodites Zhang, 1989
†Eldermyrmex Heterick & Shattuck, 2011
†Emplastus Donisthorpe, 1920
†Eotapinoma Dlussky, 1988
†Eurymyrmex Zhang, Sun & Zhang, 1994
†Kotshkorkia Dlussky, 1981
†Ktunaxia Lapolla & Greenwalt, 2015
†Leptomyrmula Emery, 1913
†Petraeomyrmex Carpenter, 1930
†Proiridomyrmex Dlussky & Rasnitsyn, 2003
†Protazteca Carpenter, 1930
†Usomyrma Dlussky, Radchenko & Dubovikoff, 2014
†Yantaromyrmex Dlussky & Dubovikoff, 2013
†Zherichinius Dlussky, 1988

See also
 List of ants of Andorra

References

External links

 
Ant subfamilies
Taxa named by Auguste Forel